National Congress is a term used in the names of various political parties and legislatures  .

Political parties
Ethiopia: Oromo National Congress
Guyana: People's National Congress (Guyana)
India: Indian National Congress
Iraq: Iraqi National Congress
Pakistan, Bangladesh: National Congress (Pakistan, Bangladesh)
Nigeria: Ijaw National Congress
Papua New Guinea: People's National Congress Party
South Africa: African National Congress
Sri Lanka: National Congress (Sri Lanka)
Sudan:
National Congress (Sudan), an Islamist, pan-Arabist party, given the name National Congress Party c. 1988/1989
Sudanese Congress Party, a social-democratic party, initially created as the National Congress in 1986

National legislatures
National Congress of Argentina
National Congress of Belgium
National Congress of Brazil
National Congress of Chile
National People's Congress of the People's Republic of China
National Congress of Ecuador
National Congress of Guatemala
National Congress of Honduras
General National Congress (Libya)
National Congress of Paraguay
Congress of the Republic of Venezuela

Other uses
National Congress Battalions, Malta, 1798–1800
National Congress of the Chinese Communist Party, a party congress held every five years
National Congress of American Indians, an American indigenous rights organization
National Congress of Australia's First Peoples, national representative body for Indigenous Australians, 2009–2019

See also
 Congress (disambiguation), comparative term
 Congress of Deputies (disambiguation)
 Congress of People's Deputies (disambiguation)
 National Conference (disambiguation)
 National Congress Party (disambiguation)
 National Convention (disambiguation)